Laverie Vallee née Cooper (July 18, 1875 – February 6, 1949), best known by her stage name Charmion, was an American vaudeville trapeze artist and strongwoman whose well-publicized suggestive performance was captured on film in 1901 by Thomas Edison.

Career
According to the Journal of Sport History article "Flying, Flirting, and Flexing: Charmion's Trapeze Act, Sexuality, and Physical Culture at the Turn of the Twentieth Century", she made her debut on December 25, 1897, at Koster and Bial's vaudeville theatre in New York City.

A native of Sacramento, Charmion built her act around a memorable routine which opened with her on-stage entrance dressed in full Victorian street attire. She subsequently mounted the trapeze and disrobed down to her acrobat leotards in the midst of the trapeze's swinging motion. She appears to have begun performing while in her late teens, and this was part of her repertoire at least as early as May 1, 1898, and possibly before 1896, when her act was seen by critic George Jean Nathan while he was a boy.

Charmion performed a version of this then-risqué striptease for an Edison short film, "Trapeze Disrobing Act", on November 11, 1901. Two men are pictured in the film as an on-screen audience, applauding Charmion, and catching her clothes. This was deemed necessary so that the men in the actual audience would have a visual cue to enjoy the performance, instead of reacting with disgust, as polite society then demanded.

Death
Vallee died in Santa Ana, California, at the age of 73.

References

External links

 
 
 

1875 births
1949 deaths
Actresses from Sacramento, California
American silent film actresses
Strongwomen
Trapeze artists
Vaudeville performers
20th-century American actresses
Articles containing video clips
People associated with physical culture